War Department (WD) Austerity 2-10-0 No. 73755 Longmoor is a preserved steam locomotive.

One of the 150 WD Austerity 2-10-0s all of which were built by the North British Locomotive Company. 73755 was built in 1945, NBL Works No.  25601. It subsequently became the 1000th British built steam locomotive to be ferried to Mainland Europe in support of the British Army. As publicity, she was given the name Longmoor. The nameplate reads:

On arrival however, 73755 along with several other WD locomotives, was deemed temporarily surplus to requirements and stored at Calais.

After the war, No. 73755 was one of the ex-WD locomotives sold to Nederlandse Spoorwegen (NS; Dutch Railways).  She was taken into NS stock as part of NS Class 5000II, and given the NS No. 5085.  She was withdrawn in 1952 and set aside for preservation.  She is currently in the Nederlands Spoorwegmuseum (Dutch Railway Museum) in Utrecht.

References 

 R.C. Statius Muller, A.J. Veenendaal jr., H. Waldorp: De Nederlandse stoomlocomotieven. Uitg. De Alk, Alkmaar, 2005.  

WD Austerity 2-10-0
NBL locomotives
Steam locomotives of the Netherlands